A Son, also known as Bik Eneich: Un fils (a combination of the original Arabic and French titles:) is a 2019 film directed by Mehdi Barsaoui in his feature film debut and co-produced between France, Lebanon, Tunisia and Qatar. Starring Sami Bouajila and Najla Ben Abdallah as middle-class Tunisian parents, film is about a family trip soon after the Tunisian Revolution that is disrupted after terrorists shoot their car and gravely injure their son, who needs a liver transplant to survive.

References

2019 films
French drama films
Lebanese drama films
Tunisian drama films
Qatari drama films
2010s French-language films
2010s Arabic-language films
2019 multilingual films
French multilingual films
Lebanese multilingual films
Tunisian multilingual films
2010s French films